Reptilisocia solomonensis is a species of moth of the family Tortricidae. It is found on the Solomon Islands.

The wingspan is about 20 mm. The ground colour of the forewings is yellowish, diffusely marked  with orange preserved as a large dorsal blotch extending from beyond the base of the wing to the end of the termen and to before the apex subcostally. The remaining area is pale brownish, suffused with brown, except for the medio-costal area. The costa is strigulated with brown and the termen is brown with refractive dots. The hindwings are cream tinged with orange at the apex.

Etymology
The species name refers to the country of origin, the Solomon Islands.

References

Moths described in 2012
Tortricini
Taxa named by Józef Razowski